Ophiogomphus edmundo, the Edmund's snaketail, is a species of dragonfly in the family Gomphidae. It is endemic to the United States.  Its natural habitat is rivers. It is threatened by habitat loss.

References 

Insects of the United States
Ophiogomphus
Taxonomy articles created by Polbot
Insects described in 1951